Elena Koleva (born December 1, 1977) is a retired Bulgarian volleyball player. She plays in countries like Italy, Germany and Greece. 

She participated at the 2002 FIVB Volleyball Women's World Championship in Germany. As of 2014, she plays for Il Bisonte San Casciano.

References 

Living people
Bulgarian women's volleyball players
Olympiacos Women's Volleyball players
1977 births
Wing spikers